Legend of Keepers: Career of a Dungeon Manager is a dungeon management game developed and published in 2021 by Goblinz Studio.

Gameplay 
Players are an employee of a company that runs dungeons.  To defend against raiding adventurers, they are put in charge of recruiting monsters and placing traps.  Players control the monsters in turn-based tactical combat.  If adventurers survive to the end of the dungeon, the player faces them as a final boss.  Between attacks by adventurers, players manage their dungeon and optionally trigger random events.  If the player is defeated in the boss fight, they must start over.  Players retain unlocks when they are defeated, and their level-ups can carry over to another session.

Development 
The game was in early access for about a year.  The developers credited this with giving them early feedback on how to improve the game, such as prioritizing a free play mode over additional bosses.  Legend of Keepers was released for Windows, MacOS, Linux, and Switch on April 29, 2021.

Reception 

On Metacritic, Legend of Keepers received positive reviews on Windows and mixed reviews on the Switch.  Christopher Livingston of PC Gamer said the game was not as polished as Darkest Dungeon, which it resembled in reverse, but he had fun playing it.  Nicolas Dixmier of Jeuxvideo.com called it a funny game that does not revolutionize the roguelite genre.

References

External links 
 

2021 video games
Windows games
MacOS games
Linux games
Nintendo Switch games
Single-player video games
Indie video games
Turn-based tactics video games
Dungeon management games